The World Series of Poker Europe (WSOPE) is the first expansion effort of World Series of Poker-branded poker tournaments outside the United States. Since 1970, participants have had to travel to Las Vegas if they wanted to compete in the World Series of Poker (WSOP).  Although the WSOP held circuit events in other locations, the main tournaments, which awarded bracelets to the winners, were exclusively held in Las Vegas. The inaugural WSOPE, held in 2007, marked the first time that a WSOP bracelet was awarded outside Las Vegas.

In 2004, Harrah's Casinos purchased the rights to the WSOP label. Harrah's later purchased London Clubs International (LCI). LCI operates three casinos in the London area—Fifty, Leicester Square, and The Sportsman. After the purchase of these casinos, Harrah's decided to expand its WSOP label into Europe. European casinos typically have a different environment than those in the U.S. Jeffrey Pollack, the WSOP Commissioner, indicated that the WSOPE would have a "style and flair that is both unique and appropriate to the setting. So don't be surprised if we require participants to wear blazers at the tables. If James Bond were hosting a poker tournament it may look like the World Series of Poker Europe."

In marketing the WSOPE, Harrah's Casino did not rely upon the reputation of Harrah's or the WSOP alone. On July 5, 2007, Harrah's announced its alliance with England-based Betfair, one of the largest online gaming companies in the world. The agreement, the largest-ever union of an online and offline gaming company, is intended to build on Betfair's European reputation in advertising the WSOPE. Due to changes in U.S. laws, effective in 2007, the WSOP could no longer accept money from online gambling companies. This prevented the WSOP from acknowledging WSOP qualifiers from online events. The WSOPE is not bound by this limitation. The United Kingdom Gambling Act of 2005 allows for legal regulated online poker sites. Furthermore, as the laws that govern the age of gambling differ in England than the U.S., the WSOPE admits younger players. In 2007, one of these younger players, 18-year-old Annette "Annette_15" Obrestad became the youngest player to win a WSOP bracelet event.

The second WSOPE took place between September 19 and October 1, 2008. It consisted of four events held at the Casino at the Empire in Leicester Square, London. The 2008 WSOPE was particularly notable,  as Jesper Hougaard became the first person to win a bracelet at both the WSOP and WSOPE. Three-time bracelet winner John Juanda won his fourth bracelet in the WSOPE Main Event. Ivan Demidov, who was one of the November Nine—players scheduled to play in November for the WSOP Main Event—advanced to the final table of the WSOPE, becoming the first player to make it to the final table at both the WSOP and WSOPE Main Events.

Key

Results

Event 1: £1,500 No-Limit Hold'em

 4-Day Event: Friday, September 19, 2008 to Monday, September 22, 2008
 Number of buy-ins: 410
 Total Prize Pool: £
 Number of Payouts: 45
 Winning Hand: 
 References:

Event 2: £2,500 H.O.R.S.E.
 3-Day Event: Monday, September 22, 2008 to Wednesday, September 24, 2008
 Number of buy-ins: 110
 Total Prize Pool: £
 Number of Payouts: 16
 Winning Hand:  (Seven-card stud)
 References:

Event 3: £5,000 Pot-Limit Omaha
 3-Day Event: Wednesday, September 24, 2008 to Friday, September 26, 2008
 Number of buy-ins: 165
 Total Prize Pool: £
 Number of Payouts: 18
 Winning Hand: 
 References:

Event 4: £10,000 No-Limit Hold'em Main Event

 6-Day Event: Saturday, September 27, 2008 to Thursday, October 2, 2008
 Number of buy-ins: 362
 Total Prize Pool: £
 Number of Payouts: 36
 Winning Hand: 
 References:

The final table took a WSOP record 22 hours to finish. Heads up between John Juanda and Stanislav Alekhin took more than seven hours of play, another WSOP record. It took 242 hands to eliminate the first seven players and it took another 242 hands heads up before Juanda secured the win.

Ivan Demidov finished third, becoming the first player to make the final table at both the WSOP and WSOPE Main Events.

References

World Series of Poker Europe